Human Immunology is a peer-reviewed academic journal published by Elsevier. This journal features original research articles, review articles and brief communications on the subjects of immunogenetics, cellular immunology and immune regulation, and clinical immunology, and is the journal of the American Society for Histocompatibility and Immunogenetics (ASHI).

The 2021 Thomson Reuters Journal Citation Reports impact factor for Human Immunology is 2.211.

Human Immunology was established in 1980, and has published 12 issues per year since 1983. The journal has had four editors-in-chief; Bernard Amos was editor from 1980 to 1996, Nicole Suciu-Foca was editor from 1997 to 2013, Steven Mack was editor from 2014 to 2016, and Amy Hahn has been editor since 2016.

Abstracting and indexing 
The journal is abstracted/indexed in:
 BIOSIS
 Chemical Abstracts
 Current Contents
 EMBASE
 Elsevier BIOBASE
 MEDLINE
 SIIC
 Scopus

American Society for Histocompatibility and Immunogenetics 

The American Society for Histocompatibility and Immunogenetics (ASHI) is the professional society that runs the journal of Human Immunology. Founded in 1972, the society has since gathered over 1,000 members from over 33 countries.

ASHI is the first HLA organization established in the world. They are responsible for accrediting HLA typing laboratories internationally to maintain the quality standards for histocompatibility testing between donors and recipients, with UNOS and NMDP utilizing its service to inspect and determine whether laboratories complied to industrial practices. They also published the first CWD (common and well documented) allele list, encouraging researchers to compare genetic differences between populations.

ASHI also sponsors several awards in recognition of accomplishments and contributions to the field of histocompatibility and immunogenetics, including:

 Rose Payne Award
 Bernard Amos Distinguished Scientist Award
 Paul I. Terasaki Clinical Science Award
 Distinguished Service Award
 Outstanding Technologist Award
 J Marilyn MacQueen Rising Star Award (formerly ASHI/SEOPF J. Marilyn MacQueen Award)
 Scholar Awards & International Scholar Award
 Travel Fund Award
 Young Investigator Awards

ASHI has also collaborated with EFI (European Federation for Immunogenetics), APHIA (Asia Pacific Histocompatibility and Immunogenetics Association), ARSHI (Arabian Society for Histocompatibility and Immunogenetics) to organize an international summer school for professionals focusing on studying the theories and applications of histocompatibility and immunogenetics.

See also 

 Host versus graft

References

External links 
 
 

Elsevier academic journals
Immunology journals
Monthly journals
Publications established in 1980
English-language journals